The 2015 Singapore Cup was the 18th season of Singapore's annual premier club football tournament organised by Football Association of Singapore. Due to sponsorship reasons, the Singapore Cup is also known as the RHB Singapore Cup. Balestier Khalsa were the defending champions, having won their first trophy the previous year. Albirex Niigata (S) were the eventual winners, beating Home United 2–1 in the finals.

Teams

A total of 11 teams participated in the 2015 Singapore Cup. 8 of the teams were from domestic S.League and the other three were invited from the Philippines, Cambodia and Laos. Both Courts Young Lions and Harimau Muda B did not participate in this edition of Singapore Cup.

S.League Clubs
  Albirex Niigata (S)
 Balestier Khalsa
  DPMM FC
 Geylang International
 Home United
 Hougang United
 Tampines Rovers
 Warriors FC

Invited Foreign Teams
  Global FC
  Lao Police Club
  Svay Rieng

Format

Six teams were drawn for the preliminary round while the other five teams will receive a Bye in that round. They will play against one another in a single-legged knockout basis. Winners of this round will progress and advance to the quarter-finals. Thereafter, matches are played in two legs with the exception of the one-match finals.  Unlike the previous season, away goals rule does not apply.

For any match in the knockout stage, a draw after 90 minutes of regulation time is followed by two 15 minute periods of extra time to determine a winner. If the teams are still tied, a penalty shoot-out is held to determine a winner.

Knockout phase

Bracket

Preliminary round
The draw for the preliminary round was held on 17 April 2015 at the Ocean Financial Centre’s Event Plaza. Six teams involved in this round will play in a single leg knockout basis. The matches will be played from 22 to 27 May 2015. Winners of this round will progress and advance to the quarter-finals.

Quarter-finals

Albirex Niigata (S) and Geylang International will join five other teams in this round after winning their matches in the Preliminary Round . All matches will be played in a two-legged knockout basis. Away goal rule will not be applied in this tournament. Fixtures will be announced on a later date and winners of this round will progress and advance to the semi-finals.

|}

First Leg

Second Leg

Semi-finals

|}

First Leg

Second Leg

Third/Fourth Placing

Final

Statistics

Goalscorers

References

External links
 Official S.League website
 Football Association of Singapore website

2015
2015 domestic association football cups
2015 in Singaporean football